Scipione Dentice (29 January 1560 – 21 April 1633) was a Neapolitan keyboard composer. He is to be distinguished from his colleague and exact contemporary Scipione Stella, a member of Carlo Gesualdo's circle. He is also to be distinguished from his grandfather Luigi Dentice, the music theorist, and uncle Fabrizio Dentice, the lutenist.

The two Scipiones were acquainted; the Spanish composer Sebastián Raval records that both Scipione Dentice and Scipione Stella were present with Luca Marenzio at the Peretti palace in Rome when he performed.

References

1560 births
1633 deaths
Italian classical composers
Italian male classical composers
Renaissance composers
Musicians from Naples